Baje Bhagat (16 July 1898 – 26 February 1939) was an Indian litterateur, poet, ragni writer, saang artist and Haryanvi cultural show artist.

Biography

Bhagat was born on 16 July 1898 in Sisana Village of Sonipat District of the erstwhile Punjab Province (Now in Haryana). He wrote almost 15 to 20 works that gave him unusual recognition in Haryana in the early 1920s. He was stabbed to death while sleeping outdoors

Writings

Bhagat's writings include:-
Yaa Lage Bhaanji teri (या लगै भाणजी तेरी / बाजे भगत)
Laad karan lagi maat (लाड करण लगी मात, पूत की कौळी भरकै / बाजे भगत)
saachi baat kahan menh (साची बात कहण म्हं सखी होया करै तकरार / बाजे भगत)
Dhan maya ke baare menh (धन माया के बारे म्हं किसे बिरले तै दिल डाट्या जा सै / बाजे भगत)
Bipta ke menh firun jhaadti (बिपता के म्हं फिरूं झाड़ती घर-घर के जाळे / बाजे भगत)
Main nirdhan kangaal aadmi (मैं निर्धन कंगाल आदमी तूं राजा की जाइ / बाजे भगत)
Bera na kad darshan honge (बेरा ना कद दर्शन होंगे पिया मिलन की लागरही आस / बाजे भगत)

बाजे राम का राजबाला अजीत सिंह

करके सगाई भूल गए हुई बड़े दिनां की बात

राजबाला का ब्याह करदो बड़ी खुशी के साथ – टेक

साथ मेरी धींगताणा बण रहया सै

इसा के तू महाराणा बण रहया सै

न्यू बोल्या घणा के स्याणा बण रहया सै

न्यू तै बीगड़ ज्यागी बात

राजबाला का ब्याह करदो बड़ी खुशी के साथ

करके सगाई भूल गए हुई बड़े दिनां की बात

राजबाला का ब्याह करदो बड़ी खुशी के साथ

करी बाप मेरे नै बेईमानी

हो अपनी खो बैठा ज़िंदगानी

न्यू बोल्या समय होया करे आणी जाणी

या माणस के ना हाथ

राजबाला का ब्याह करदो बड़ी खुशी के साथ

करके सगाई भूल गए हुई बड़े दिनां की बात

राजबाला का ब्याह करदो बड़ी खुशी के साथ

भगत बाजे के लगी कटारी

न्यू बोल्या मात छूटगी म्हारी

न्यू बोल्या एक लालाजी ने बोली मारी

जला पड़ा सै गात

राजबाला का ब्याह करदो बड़ी खुशी के साथ

करके सगाई भूल गए हुई बड़े दिनां की बात

राजबाला का ब्याह करदो बड़ी खुशी के साथ

बाजे राम का नवरतन

रतनकंवर ने छज्जे ऊपर खड़ी सेठाणी दीख गई

हाथ में लोटा सूर्यदेव को देती पाणी दीख गई – टेक

जेठ लगूँ और बड्डा कायदा न हक ठट्ठे हाँसी का

इसी इसी मन में आवे करूँ दरसन सोला रासी का

या परद्याँ में रहणे आली इका बाणा जणू हो दासी का

इसी परी ने देख देख मन डोले संत सन्यासी का

चाँद खिल्या पूरणमासी का इसी सुरत निमाणी दीख गई

रतनकंवर ने छज्जे ऊपर खड़ी सेठाणी दीख गई

हाथ में लोटा सूर्यदेव को देती पाणी दीख गई

मैं न्यूं बूझूंगा सेठाणी के फायदा विपदा ओटे में

मेरे चाल के मौज करे न पर्दे जाली कोठे में

सोने के जेवर घडवा द्यून तीअल चिपा ले गोटे में

जीब सिंगर के चलेगी हो तकरार बड़े छोटे में

नंदस्वरूपक्यान की बहू टोटे में अपनी हाणी दीख गई

रतनकंवर ने छज्जे ऊपर खड़ी सेठाणी दीख गई

हाथ में लोटा सूर्यदेव को देती पाणी दीख गई

लैला ऊपर मजनूँ ने लई डाभ जमा तन सारे में

शीरीन कारण फरहाद ने अपनी जान फंसा ली धारे में

हीर के कारण राँझे की भी बजी बंसरी ढ़ारे में

चंदरकिरण पे मदनसेन के बेड़ी घली चौबारे में

मन्ने भी इके बारे में तकलीफ उठाणी दीख गई

रतनकंवर ने छज्जे ऊपर खड़ी सेठाणी दीख गई

हाथ में लोटा सूर्यदेव को देती पाणी दीख गई

हरदेवा सतगुरु की थी बाणी बड़ी सगत की

उनकी सेवा करके मने पदवी मिली भगत की

बाजे भगत सेठाणी गेलयां करनी कार खगत की

ऊपर कमरे में चढ़ग्या ना सोधी करी अगत की

अपना मरण जगत की हाँसी वही कहाणी दीख गई

रतनकंवर ने छज्जे ऊपर खड़ी सेठाणी दीख गई

हाथ में लोटा सूर्यदेव को देती पाणी दीख गई

बाजे भगत का एक भजन

शरण गहे भगवान के सब झूठी माया त्यागी

सत्यकाम विष्णुजी ने ब्राह्मण बण के गोद लिया

हरी ने अपना भगत पिछाण के कर्या आण मोक्ष बेदागी

हिरणाकुश के बेटा हुया जिसका नाम प्रह्लाद

झूठा तो प्रपंच त्याग्या ॐ नाम कर लिया याद

अहंकारी था वो राजा जिने बेटे ते किया विवाद

गिरवर से गिराय दिया अति दुख दिया भारी

खम्ब सेती बँधवा के ने सिर काटण की कर दी तयारी

अगनी में ना आंच लागि जल के मरगी हत्यारी

हो घमंड घणा था अज्ञान के दिया मार देर ना लागी

शरण गहे भगवान के सब झूठी माया त्यागी

उस हरिचन्द ने काया देदी राजपाट सारा तज के

बेटे के सिर आरा धर दिया ज्ञान हुआ जब मोरध्वज के

जल में डूबते हरि ने बचाए पास पहोञ्चगे थे वे गज के

दधीचि ऋषि हुए आवागमन मेट गए

भील्ल्णी के बेर खाये वन में जाके भेंट गए

नरसी जी की लाज राखी आप बण के सेठ गए

हरि ने दर्शन दे दिये आण के घड़ी भात भरण की आगी

शरण गहे भगवान के सब झूठी माया त्यागी

नामदेव पीपा ध्यानु कबीरा की राखी जग्ग

जनकपुरी में धनुष तोड्या इंदर की मिटाई भग्ग

वेदों के माँ गाया गया नाम तेरा सर्वग्ज्ञ

संत छाजुलाल दादा दीपचन्द कह ग्या मेरा

हरदेवा पे कृपा कर दी जो था स्वामी दास तेरा

बजे भगत भी डर के रहे जंगल बीच होगा डेरा

देंगे बीच फूँक शमशान के उड़ धूल पवन मिल ज्यागी

शरण गहे भगवान के सब झूठी माया त्यागी

See also
 Dayachand Mayna
 Lakhmi Chand
 Music of Haryana
 Haryanvi cinema
 List of Haryanvi-language films

References

Poets from Punjab, India
People from Sonipat district
1898 births
1939 deaths
Folk artists from Haryana
Poets from Haryana